Jessica Andrea Watkins (born May 14, 1988) is an American NASA astronaut, geologist, aquanaut and former international rugby player. Watkins was announced as the first Black woman who will complete an International Space Station long-term mission in April 2022. On June 9, 2022, at 7:38 UTC, she became the African American woman with the most time in space, surpassing Stephanie Wilson's 42 day, 23 hour and 46 minute record.

Early life and education
Jessica "Watty" Watkins was born on May 14, 1988, in Gaithersburg, Maryland, to Michael and Carolyn Watkins. Her family moved to Lafayette, Colorado, where she graduated from Fairview High School. She earned a bachelor's degree in geological and environmental sciences at Stanford University. There she was a member of the rugby team.

After Stanford, Watkins earned a Ph.D. in geology at the University of California, Los Angeles. Her graduate research, under the supervision of professor An Yin, focused on emplacement mechanisms for landslides on Mars and Earth, including the effect of water activity. Prior to her selection as an astronaut candidate, Watkins was a postdoctoral fellow at the California Institute of Technology, where she was also an assistant coach to the women's basketball team.

Rugby career
Watkins began playing rugby during her freshman year at Stanford and remained on the team for four years. In 2008, during her sophomore year, she was a member of the Division I national champion team. In both 2008 and 2010, Watkins became a member of First Team Collegiate Rugby All-American. She is a former American women's national team rugby player for the sevens, and played for the USA Eagles in its 3rd-place finish at the 2009 Rugby World Cup Sevens. During the World Cup she was the leading try scorer for the US team.

NASA career 

As an undergraduate, Watkins worked at the Ames Research Center to support the Mars Phoenix lander and prototype Mars drill testing. In 2009, she was chief geologist for the NASA Spaceward Bound Crew 86 at the Mars Desert Research Station. As a graduate student, she worked at the Jet Propulsion Laboratory on the NEOWISE project to survey near-Earth asteroids. Watkins also worked on planning for the Mars rover Curiosity. In 2011, Watkins served as a science operations team member for an analog mission. 

She has served as a planner for the Mars 2020 rover and a Mars sample-return mission, and was a science team member for a Desert Research and Technology Studies analog mission. As a postdoctoral fellow at Caltech, and as a collaborator on the Mars Science Laboratory Science Team, she participated in daily planning of the Mars rover activities and uses its image data combined with orbital data to investigate the stratigraphy, geology, and geomorphology of Mars.

In June 2017, Watkins was selected as a member of NASA Astronaut Group 22 and began her two-year training in August. In December 2020, she was selected to be a part of the Artemis Team to return humans to the Moon. The year 2025 is the target date for the crewed lunar landing mission. In November 2021, she became the 4th astronaut of Group 22, and first Black woman, to be assigned a long-duration mission to the International Space Station (ISS) after being chosen as the final member of SpaceX Crew-4, which launched in April 2022. 

It is Watkins’ first time in space. She is serving as a mission specialist for the six-month mission. Her role involves observing and photographing geological changes on Earth, as well as other investigations into Earth and space science, biological science, and the effects of long-duration spaceflight on humans.

NEEMO 23 
Watkins participated in NEEMO mission 23 from June 10 to 22, 2019. This mission tested technologies and objectives for deep space mission and lunar explorations on the seafloor. Watkins’ NEEMO mission was the first of its kind to feature an all-female research team led by Italian astronaut Samantha Cristoforetti.

Personal life
Watkins' parents live in Lafayette, Colorado.  Her hobbies include soccer, rock climbing, skiing, and creative writing.

Awards and honors
Watkins has received numerous awards for her career, academic, and athletic accomplishments, including:

 Jessica Watkins Day, April 19, 2022, City of Lafayette, Colorado 
 Stanford Earth Early- to Mid- Career Alumni Award, 2018
 Caltech Division of Geological and Planetary Sciences Chair's Postdoctoral Fellowship, 2015
 Postdoctoral Fellowship, California Alliance for Graduate Education and the Professoriate (AGEP), 2015
 NASA Group Achievement Award, Mars Science Laboratory Prime Mission Science and Operations Team, 2015
 Harold and Mayla Sullwold Scholarship for Academic Excellence and Outstanding Original Research, UCLA Department of Earth and Space Sciences, 2012
 Graduate Research Fellowship in Geosciences, National Science Foundation, 2012
 Diversity in the Geosciences Minority Research Grant Award, Geological Society of America, 2011
 Chancellor's Prize, UCLA, 2010
 California Space Grant Consortium Fellowship, 2010
 Division I College Rugby National Champion, Stanford Women's Rugby, 2008
 USA Rugby Collegiate All-American, 2008-2010
 Women's Sevens Rugby World Cup Semi-finalist, USA Eagles, 2009

See also
 List of African-American astronauts

References

1988 births
21st-century American geologists
21st-century American women scientists
American astronauts
American female rugby sevens players
American female rugby union players
American women geologists
California Institute of Technology people
Female rugby sevens players
Living people
People from Gaithersburg, Maryland
People from Lafayette, Colorado
Planetary scientists
Scientists from Colorado
Scientists from Maryland
SpaceX astronauts
Stanford University alumni
UCLA Department of Earth Planetary and Space Sciences alumni
United States international rugby sevens players
University of California, Los Angeles alumni
Women astronauts
Women planetary scientists
California Institute of Technology fellows